Rudolf Friedrich Alfred Clebsch (19 January 1833 – 7 November 1872) was a German mathematician who made important contributions to algebraic geometry and invariant theory. He attended the University of Königsberg and was habilitated at Berlin. He subsequently taught in Berlin and Karlsruhe. His collaboration with Paul Gordan in Giessen led to the introduction of Clebsch–Gordan coefficients for spherical harmonics, which are now widely used in quantum mechanics.

Together with Carl Neumann at Göttingen, he founded the mathematical research journal Mathematische Annalen in 1868.

In 1883 Saint-Venant translated Clebsch's work on elasticity into French and published it as Théorie de l'élasticité des Corps Solides.

Books by A. Clebsch
 Vorlesungen über Geometrie (Teubner, Leipzig, 1876-1891) edited by Ferdinand Lindemann.
 Théorie der binären algebraischen Formen (Teubner, 1872)
 Theorie der Abelschen Functionen with P. Gordan (B. G. Teubner, 1866) 
 Theorie der Elasticität fester Körper (B. G. Teubner, 1862)

See also
Clebsch graph
Clebsch representation
Clebsch surface
Eigenvalues and eigenvectors
Helmholtz equation
Hyperboloid model
Pentagram map
Quaternary cubic

References

External links

1832 births
1872 deaths
19th-century German mathematicians
Algebraic geometers
Scientists from Königsberg
People from the Province of Prussia
University of Königsberg alumni
Academic staff of the Humboldt University of Berlin
Academic staff of the Karlsruhe Institute of Technology
Academic staff of the University of Giessen
Academic staff of the University of Göttingen